This is a list of earthquakes in 1978. Only earthquakes of magnitude 6 or above are included, unless they result in damage and/or casualties, or are notable for some other reason. Events in remote areas will not be listed but included in statistics and maps. Countries are entered on the lists in order of their status in this particular year. All dates are listed according to UTC time. Maximum intensities are indicated on the Mercalli intensity scale and are sourced from United States Geological Survey (USGS) ShakeMap data. Another fairly quiet year as far as earthquakes above magnitude 7.0. The largest of the 12 events in this threshold were magnitude 7.7 and both Japan and Mexico experienced these. The Kuril Islands in Russia had a robust series of large earthquakes in March. Iran dominated the death toll for the year. One event in September left 20,000 dead. Japan had two destructive events including the joint largest event of the year. October had no events above magnitude 6 which is an unusual quiescence.

By death toll

Listed are earthquakes with at least 10 dead.

By magnitude

Listed are earthquakes with at least 7.0 magnitude.

By month

January

February

March

April

May

June

July

August

September

October

November

December

References

External links 

1978
1978 earthquakes
1978 natural disasters
1978